Viktor Petrovich Kalinkin (Russian: Виктор Петрович Калинкин; born 23 February 1960) is a Soviet former middle-distance runner who specialised in the 800 metres. He represented his country at the 1983 World Championships. In addition he won the silver at the 1985 Summer Universiade.

International competitions

Personal bests
Outdoor
800 metres – 1:44.73 (Kiev 1984)
1000 metres – 2:19.21 (Tallinn 1985)
1500 metres – 3:37.1 (Moscow 1984)
Indoor
600 metres – 1:16.83 (Moscow 1989)
800 metres – 1:47.6 (Moscow 1991)
1000 metres – 2:19.89 (Moscow 1984)
1500 metres – 3:44.32 (Volgograd 1988)

References

All-Athletics profile

1960 births
Living people
People from Zemetchinsky District
Russian male middle-distance runners
Soviet male middle-distance runners
Universiade medalists in athletics (track and field)
Universiade silver medalists for the Soviet Union
Competitors at the 1986 Goodwill Games
Friendship Games medalists in athletics
Sportspeople from Penza Oblast